Pedro Reszka Moreau (June 10, 1872 - March 6, 1960) was a Chilean painter. He won the National Prize of Art of Chile in 1947.

References

1872 births
1960 deaths
People from Antofagasta
University of Chile alumni
Chilean male painters
19th-century Chilean painters
19th-century Chilean male artists
Chilean male artists
20th-century Chilean painters
Male painters
20th-century Chilean male artists